Balthasar Christian Bertram (died 1787) was a German violinist and composer of the late Baroque era.

Life
Bertram was born in Salzwedel. His birth year is unknown. After studying the violin with Johann Gottlieb Graun, he entered the Hofkapelle of Frederick the Great in Berlin. Here, he worked as a Kammermusikus and violinist in the Opera where he received a salary of 200 Thaler. He remained in Berlin until his death in 1787.

Works
Sonata in E minor for flute and continuo
Sonata in C major for viola and continuo
Sonata in G major for violin and obbligato harpsichord
Sinfonia in B-flat major for strings and continuo

References

People from Salzwedel
18th-century German people
German Baroque composers
German male classical composers
German Classical-period composers
German classical violinists
Male classical violinists
18th-century classical composers
1787 deaths
Year of birth unknown
18th-century German composers
18th-century German male musicians